Oleg Ivanovich Yankovsky (23 February 1944 – 20 May 2009) was a Soviet and Russian actor who excelled in psychologically sophisticated roles of modern intellectuals. In 1991, he became, together with Sofia Pilyavskaya, the last person to be named a People's Artist of the USSR.

Biography

Early life
Oleg Ivanovich Yankovsky was born on 23 February 1944 in Jezkazgan, Kazakh SSR (now Kazakhstan). His family was of noble Russian, Belarusian and Polish ancestry. His father, Ivan Pavlovich, was Life-Guards Semenovsky regiment's Stabskapitän. Yankovsky's father was arrested during the purges in the Red Army after the Tukhachevsky case and was deported with his family to Kazakhstan, where he died in the camps of the Gulag system.

After the death of Stalin, the Yankovsky family was able to leave Central Asia for Saratov. Oleg's eldest brother, Rostislav, after graduating from the Saratov Theater School, went to Minsk to play at the Russian Theater. He took 14-year-old Oleg with him due to financial concerns, as in the family there was only one breadwinner – middle brother Nikolay. In Minsk, youngest Yankovsky made his debut on the stage – it was necessary to substitute the sick performer of the episodic role of the boy in the play The Drummer.

Career
After leaving school, Yankovsky returned to Saratov, where in 1965 he graduated from the Saratov Theater School. After graduation, he was accepted into the troupe of the Saratov Drama Theater, where for eight years of work he played a number of leading roles. After success in the role of Prince Myshkin in the play The Idiot in 1973, he was invited to the Lenkom Theatre.

Yankovsky's film career was launched when he was cast in two movies The Shield and the Sword (1968) by director Vladimir Basov about World War II and Two Comrades Were Serving (1968) by Yevgeni Karelov about Russian Civil War.

During his prolific screen career, Yankovsky appeared in many film adaptations of Russian classics, notably A Hunting Accident (1977) and The Kreutzer Sonata (1987). A leading actor of Mark Zakharov's Lenkom Theatre since 1975, he starred in the TV versions of the theatre's productions, An Ordinary Miracle (1978) and The Very Same Munchhausen (1979) being the most notable. For his role in Roman Balayan's Flights in Dreams and Reality (1984), Yankovsky was awarded the USSR State Prize. He has been better known abroad for his parts in Tarkovsky's movies Mirror (as the father) and Nostalghia (in the main role).

In the early 1990s, Yankovsky also played quite different roles in Georgiy Daneliya’s tragic comedy Passport (1990) and in Karen Shakhnazarov’s historical and psychological drama The Assassin of the Tsar (1991). In 1991, he was the President of the Jury at the 17th Moscow International Film Festival.

Starting in 1993, Yankovsky ran the Kinotavr Film Festival in Sochi. He continued to receive awards for his work with several Nika Awards from the Russian Film Academy for his directorial debut Come Look at Me (2001) and Valery Todorovsky's Lyubovnik (2002). He appeared as Count Pahlen in Poor Poor Paul (2004) and as Komarovsky in a TV adaptation of Doctor Zhivago (2006), directed by Oleg Menshikov.

The last film Yankovsky appeared in was Tsar, which was released in 2009 and demonstrated at the Cannes Film Festival on 17 May 2009, just three days before his death. Yankovsky played the sophisticated role of Metropolitan Philip in his last film.

Death
On 20 May 2009, Yankovsky died from pancreatic cancer in Moscow, aged 65. A civil funeral took place at Lenkom theater. His burial was held on 22 May 2009 at Novodevichy Cemetery in the presence of his close relatives only.

Personal life
Wife – Lyudmila Zorina (born 1 May 1941), actress, Honored Artist of Russia.
Son – Filipp (born 10 October 1968), actor and film director.
Daughter-in-law – Oksana Fandera (born 7 November 1967), actress.
Grandchildren – Ivan (born 30 October 1990), actor; Elizaveta (born 1 May 1994).
Brothers – Rostislav Yankovsky (5 February 1930 – 26 June 2016), actor, People's Artist of the USSR; Nikolai Ivanovich Yankovsky (26 July 1941 – 25 May 2015), deputy director of the Saratov Puppet Theater "Teremok".
Nephew – Igor Yankovsky (born 29 April 1951), actor.

Filmography

 O lyubvi (1966) as Andrei
 The Shield and the Sword (Щит и меч) (1968, TV Mini-Series) as Heinrich Schwarzkopf
 Two Comrades Were Serving (Служили два товарища) (1968) as Andrei Nekrasov
 Wait For Me, Anna (Жди меня, Анна) (1969) as Sergei Novikov
 Those Who Have Kept the Fire (Сохранившие огонь) (1970, TV Movie) as Semen
 I Am Francysk Skaryna (Я, Франциск Скорина) (1970) as Francysk Skaryna
 About Love (О любви) (1970) as Andrew, a friend of Nicholas
 Atonement (Расплата) (1970) as Alexis Platov
 Operation "Holtsauge" (Операция "Хольцауге") (1970) as Frank Ritter
 Racers (Гонщики) (1972) as Nikolai Sergachev
 Wrath (Гнев) (1974) as Leonte Chebotaru
 Under a Stone Sky (Под каменным небом) (1974) as Jasjika, soldat
 Unexpected Joy (Нечаянные радости) (1974) as Alexei Kanin (The film was not finished)
 Police Sergeant (Сержант милиции) (1974) as Criminal nicknamed Prince
 Mirror (Зеркало) (1975) as the father
 Bonus (Премия) (1975) as Lev Solomahin
 The Captivating Star of Happiness (Звезда пленительного счастья) (1975) as Kondraty Ryleyev
 Theater - this is my home (Мой дом - театр) (1975) as Dmitri A. Gorev, provincial tragedian
 Trust (Доверие) (1976) as Georgy Pyatakov
 Other people's letters (Чужие письма) (1976) as Zhenya Priakhin
 Sentimental Romance (Сентиментальный роман) (1976) as Ilya Gorodetsky
 Seventy-two degrees below zero (Семьдесят два градуса ниже нуля) (1976) as navigator Sergey Popov
 Retired colonel (Полковник в отставке) (1977) as Alexei, son of colonel
 Word for protection (Слово для защиты) (1976) as Ruslan Shevernev
 Long criminal case (Длинное, длинное дело) (1977) as attorney Vladimir Vorontsov
 Sweet Woman (Сладкая женщина) (1977) as Tikhon Sokolov
 Wrong Connection (Обратная связь) (1977) as Leonid Aleksandrovich Sakulin
 A Hunting Accident (Мой ласковый и нежный зверь) (1978) as Sergey Kamyshev
 An Ordinary Miracle (Обыкновенное чудо) (1979, TV Movie) as The Wizard
 Turnabout (Поворот) (1979) as Victor Vedeneev
 The Very Same Munchhausen (Тот самый Мюнхгаузен) (1979, TV Movie) as Baron Munchausen
 Open book (Открытая книга) (1979) as Raevski
 We are the undersigned (Мы, нижеподписавшиеся...) (1981, TV Movie) as Gennady Semenov
 The Belkin Tales. The Shot (Повести Белкина. Выстрел) (1981) as Count
 The Hound of the Baskervilles (Собака Баскервилей) (1981, TV Mini-Series) as Jack Stapleton
 Hat (Шляпа) (1981) as Dmitri Denisov
 Love by Request (Влюблен по собственному желанию) (1983) as Igor Bragin
 The House That Swift Built (Дом, который построил Свифт) (1982, TV Movie) as Jonathan Swift
 Flights in Dreams and Reality (Полёты во сне и наяву) (1983) as Sergey Makarov
 Nostalghia (Ностальгия) (1983) as Andrei Gorchakov
 Kiss (Поцелуй) (1983, TV Movie) as staff captain Michael Ryabovitch
 Two hussar (Два гусара) (1984) as Count Fyodor Turbin
 Keep me, my talisman (Храни меня, мой талисман) (1986) as Alexey
 The Kreutzer Sonata (Крейцерова соната) (1987) as Vasily Pozdnyshev
 Tracker (Филёр) (1987) as Vorobyov
 To Kill a Dragon (Убить Дракона) (1988) as Dragon
 My 20th Century (Мой двадцатый век) (1989) as Z
 Mado, Hold for Pick Up (1990) as director Jean-Marie
 Passport (Паспорт) (1990) as Boris
 The Assassin of the Tsar (Цареубийца) (1991) as Dr.Smirnov / Tsar Nicholas II
 Dreams of Russia (Сны о России) (1992) as Erik Laxmann
 Dark (Тьма) (1992) as Terrorist
 Me Ivan, You Abraham (Я - Иван, ты - Абрам) (1993) as Prince
 Terra incognita (1994) as Odi Atragon
 Mute Witness (Немой свидетель) (1995) as Larsen
 ...Pervaya lyubov (1995)
 The Government Inspector (Ревизор) (1996) as Judge Lyapkin-Tyapkin
 The Fatal Eggs (Роковые яйца) (1996) as Vladimir Ipat'evich Persikov
 Muzhchina dlya molodoy zhenshchiny (1996)
 Milyy drug davno zabytykh let... (1996)
 Alissa (1998) as Kosicz
 Rayskoye yablochko (1998) as Zhora
 Paradise apple (Райское яблочко) (1998) as George
 Chinese Service (Китайский сервиз) (1999) as Count Stroganov
 The Man Who Cried (Человек, который плакал) (2000) as Father
 Town Musicians of Bremen&Co (Бременские музыканты и Со) (2000) as Old Troubadour
 Come Look at Me (Приходи на меня посмотреть) (2001) as Igor
 Patul lui Procust (2002) as George Ladima
 The Lover (Любовник) (2002) as Dmitry Charyshev
 Poor Poor Paul (Бедный, бедный Павел) (2003) as Count Pahlen
 Doctor Zhivago (Доктор Живаго) (2006, TV Mini-Series) as Komarovsky
 Guilty Without Fault (Без вины виноватые) (2008) as Gregory Muroff
 Stilyagi (Стиляги) (2008) as Fred's father
 Birds of Paradise (Райские птицы) (2008) as Nicholas
 Tsar (Царь) (2009) as Metropolitan Philip Kolychev
 Anna Karenina (Анна Каренина) (2009, TV Mini-Series) as Alexei Karenin (final appearance)

Honours and awards
Soviet and Russian awards
 1977 – Honored Artist of the RSFSR
 1984 – People's Artist of the RSFSR
 1987 – USSR State Prize – for his role in "Flights in dream and reality"
 1989 – Vasilyev Brothers State Prize of the RSFSR – for role in "The Kreutzer Sonata"
 1991 – People's Artist of the USSR
 28 December 1995 – Order "For Merit to the Fatherland", 4th class – for services to the state, many years of fruitful work in the arts and culture
 1996 – State Prize of the Russian Federation - the main role in Anton Chekhov's play "The Seagull" at the Moscow State Theatre, (Lenkom)
 2002 – State Prize of the Russian Federation - the main role in the play "Jester Balakirev" of the Moscow State Theatre
 11 August 2007 – Order "For Merit to the Fatherland", 3rd class – for his great contribution to the development of theatrical art, and many years of fruitful activity
 23 February 2009 – Order "For Merit to the Fatherland", 2nd class – for outstanding contributions to the development of domestic theatrical and cinematic arts

Cinematic and public awards
 1977 – Lenin Komsomol Prize – "for talented contemporary incarnation of the images in the movie"
 1983 – Best Actor of the Year – for starring in the film Love by Request (according to a poll of the magazine "Soviet Screen")
 1983 – Winner of the category "Best actor" of the All-Union Film Festival
 1988 – Prize for Best Actor (in the film "Filer") at Valladolid International Film Festival
 1989 – Award "for outstanding contributions to the profession" at the "Constellation" (Sozvezdie) film festival for his role in To Kill a Dragon
 1991 – Nika Award, three times; in the "Actor", for Best Actor in the film "Regicide" and for Best Actor in the film "Passport"
 2001 – Award for Best Actor at the Sochi Open Russian Film Festival Kinotavr – for the film "Come Look at Me"
 2001 – Prize of the Russian Cultural Foundation at ORFF Kinotavr in Sochi
 2001 – Grand Prix "Gold" Listapad at the Minsk International Film Festival "Listapad" – for his role in "Come look at me"
 2001 – First place in the competition "Vyborg Account" at the film festival "Window to Europe" in Vyborg – for the film "Come Look at Me"
 2001 – Stanislavsky Theatre Prize – for the main role in the play "Jester Balakirev" of the Moscow State Theatre, "Lenk" [74]
 2002 – Nika Award – for Best Actor in the film "The Lover"
 2002 – The award "Golden Aries" – for Best Actor in the film "The Lover"
 2002 – Award for Best Actor at the ORFF "Kinotavr" in Sochi – for his role in "The Lover"
 2002 – Award for Best Actor at the festival "Constellation" – for his role in the movie "The Lover"
 2002 – Winner of "Idol" in the "Idol of the Year" – for the main role in the play "Jester Balakirev" of the Moscow State Theatre, "Lenk" and for his role in "Come look at me"
 2003 – Golden Eagle Award – for Best Supporting Actor in the film "Poor, Poor Pavel"
 2003 – Special Award from the Administration of Krasnodar Krai ORFF "Kinotavr" in Sochi
 2005 – Theatre Prize "Hit of the Season" – for the play "Tout payé", or "Paid by all"
 2006 – Golden Eagle Award – for Best Actor on Television (in multiserial film "Doctor Zhivago")
 2006 – Prize of the Russian Television Academy TEFI – for best actor on television (in multiserial film "Doctor Zhivago")
 2007 – Award "Triumph"
 2008 – Public award – the Order of St. Alexander Nevsky, "For Fatherland and work"
 2009 – Award "Triumph"
 2009 – Stanislavsky Award (posthumously given to his son Filipp)
 2009 – Prize "long-term President" Kinotavr – for outstanding contribution to Russian cinema" (posthumously)
 2009 – Award for Best Actor at the "Constellation" (Sozvezdie) film festival – a starring role in "Anna Karenina" (posthumously)
 2010 – Golden Eagle Special Prize for his contribution to the development of national cinema (posthumously)
 2010 – Nika Award for 2009 – "Best Actor" (posthumously), for the combination of roles in the film "Anna Karenina" and "King"

References

External links

 
 Oleg Yankovsky, Russian Film Star, Dies at 65 in the New York Times
 Obituary: Oleg Yankovsky in the Guardian
 Obituary in the Independent
 Obituary by the Associated Press on Legacy.com
Biography of Oleg Yankovsky

1944 births
2009 deaths
20th-century Russian male actors
21st-century Russian male actors
Male actors from Moscow
People from Karaganda Region
Honored Artists of the RSFSR
People's Artists of the RSFSR
People's Artists of the USSR
Recipients of the Lenin Komsomol Prize
Recipients of the Nika Award
Recipients of the Order "For Merit to the Fatherland", 2nd class
Recipients of the Order "For Merit to the Fatherland", 3rd class
Recipients of the Order "For Merit to the Fatherland", 4th class
Recipients of the USSR State Prize
Recipients of the Vasilyev Brothers State Prize of the RSFSR
State Prize of the Russian Federation laureates
Russian male film actors
Russian male stage actors
Russian male television actors
Russian male voice actors
Soviet male film actors
Soviet male stage actors
Soviet male television actors
Soviet male voice actors
Polish deportees to Soviet Union
20th-century Polish nobility
Russian people of Belarusian descent
Russian people of Polish descent
Deaths from cancer in Russia
Deaths from pancreatic cancer
Burials at Novodevichy Cemetery